Oban High School is a secondary school in Oban, Argyll, Scotland. The head teacher is Peter Bain. Mr Bain has been the head teacher since 2008. The roll is currently 874. A new school opened in April 2018.

History

Oban High School opened in 1890 as Oban Higher Grade School. The building was designed by Alexander Shairp. Former teachers at the school have included Iain Crichton Smith and John MacKay, Baron MacKay of Ardbrecknish.

Notable people

Dr Anna Keay – architectural historian, author, TV person
Angus Peter Campbell, born 1952, poet, novelist, journalist, broadcaster and actor.
Susie Wolff – racing driver, Formula 1 TV pundit, Formula E team principal
Magnus Bradbury – rugby union player
 David Dougal Williams – Artist and Principal Art Teacher at Oban High School from 1919 to 1922
Magnus MacFarlane-Barrow –  humanitarian, founder and CEO of Mary's Meals and former Scotland Shinty internationalist
Anne Lorne Gillies – singer, writer and Gaelic activist.

Pupil Leadership 
Oban High School has a clan system pupil leadership programme. The school has four clans and each clan has two clan leaders selected from S6. In addition Oban High School also has school captains; this has traditionally been a 'head boy' and 'head girl'.

References

External links
Oban High School official website
Oban High School at Education Scotland
Oban High School at Argyll and Bute

Oban
Secondary schools in Argyll and Bute
Educational institutions established in 1890
1890 establishments in Scotland